Sheila Bartels is a Ghanaian entrepreneur and politician. She contested in the 2020 Ghanaian General Election and won the parliamentary seat for Ablekuma North Constituency.

Politics 
Bartels is a member of the New Patriotic Party. In December 2020, she was elected member of Parliament for Ablekuma North Constituency after she competed in the 2020 Ghanaian General Election and won. She polled 54,821 votes which represents 64.26% of the total votes cast. She was elected over Ashley Mensah Winifred of the National Democratic Congress and Princess Agyemang Awuku of the Ghana Union Movement. These obtained 29,772, and 716 votes respectively out of the total valid votes cast. These were equivalent to 34.90%, and 0.84% respectively of total valid votes cast.

Personal life 
She is the daughter of Kwamena Bartels who was also member of parliament of Ablekuma North from January 1997 to January 2009. She was born on 9 March 1975. She is from  Gomoa Assin in the Central Region in Ghana.

References

Living people
21st-century Ghanaian women politicians
New Patriotic Party politicians
Ghanaian MPs 2021–2025
Year of birth missing (living people)